The FIL European Luge Championships 1929 took place in Semmering, Austria under the auspices of the Internationaler Schlittensportsverband (ISSV - International Sled Sports Federation in ), a forerunner to the International Luge Federation.

Men's singles

Women's singles

Men's doubles

Medal table

References
Men's doubles European champions
Men's singles European champions
Women's singles European champions

FIL European Luge Championships
1929 in luge
Luge in Austria
1929 in Austrian sport